James Callahan may refer to:

Sports
James Callahan (ice hockey), founder of the Pittsburgh Pirates in 1925
Nixey Callahan (1874–1934), also known as Jimmy Callahan, baseball pitcher and manager
Jim Callahan (baseball) (1881–1968), baseball player for the New York Giants
Jim Callahan (American football, born 1946), American football player and author
Jim Callahan (American football, born 1920)
Jamie Callahan, American baseball pitcher

Actors
Jimmy Callahan (actor) (1891–1957), 1920s comedy short actor
James Callahan (actor) (1930–2007), American character actor

Others
James Yancy Callahan (1852–1935), Oklahoma Territorial Representative
James Callahan (pilot), American New York Sandy Hook pilot
James Callahan (Kentucky) (fl. 19th c.), Louisville businessman; 1st president of the Louisville, Harrods Creek, and Westport Railway
Jim Callahan, entertainer and contestant on Phenomenon

See also
James Callaghan (disambiguation)